A nap is a short period of sleep.

Nap or NAP may also refer to:

People
 Henry Botterell (1896–2003), Canadian World War I fighter pilot nicknamed "Nap"
 Nap Kloza (1903–1962), American baseball player and manager
 Nap Lajoie (1874–1959), American Hall-of-Fame Major League Baseball player
 Nap Milroy (1922–2012), Canadian ice hockey player
 James Napoli (1911–1992), New York mobster nicknamed "Jimmy Nap"
 Nap Reyes (1919–1995), Cuban-born Major League Baseball player
 Nap Rucker (1884–1970), American Major League Baseball pitcher

Sports and games 
 Cleveland Naps, former name of Cleveland Guardians baseball team
 Napoleon (card game) or Nap, a popular card game
 Nap, a tipster's "racing certainty"

Other uses
 Nap (fabric), the raised surface of velvet, etc.
 "The Nap", an episode of TV sitcom Seinfeld
 Nap TV, a Hungarian television production company

NAP

Codes
 Naples International Airport, IATA code NAP
 Neapolitan language, ISO 639-2/3 code nap, spoken in southern Italy
 Narragansett Pier Railroad, reporting mark NAP

Politics and government
 National Action Party (disambiguation), UK, 1980s, created by far-right activist Eddy Morrison
 National action plan (disambiguation)
 National Action Plan on the Elimination of Child Labour
 National Adaptation Programme, required by the UK 2008 Climate Change Act
 National Alliance Party (disambiguation)
 National Alliance Party (Papua New Guinea), formed in 1995
 National Allocation Plan, part of the European Union Emission Trading Scheme
 National Archives of Pakistan
 National Action Plan (Pakistan), to combat terrorism 
 National Awami Party, Pakistan, 1957-early 1970s
 Network Against Prohibition, Australian drug law reform group
 New Alliance Party, US, 1979–1993
 Non-aggression principle
 Non-aggression pact
 Noninsured Assistance Program, a US program for farmers
 North Australia Party
 Nutrition Assistance for Puerto Rico

Science and technology
 Network access point, a public facility for connection between ISPs
 Network Access Protection, a computer security technology
 Nautical Archaeology Program of Texas A&M University 
 Amsterdam Ordnance Datum (Normaal Amsterdams Peil), a geodetic datum

Other
 Auteuil-Neuilly-Passy, an area of Paris sometimes abbreviated as NAP
 Nagaland Armed Police, India
 National Academies Press, a science publisher
 National Association of Parliamentarians
 Naval Aviation Pilot, an enlisted U.S. Navy and U.S. Marine Corps pilot (until 1981)
 Nebraska AIDS Project
 New African Poets, a French hip hop group
 Non-aggression Pact (band), an American urban-electro-industrial music group, abbreviated as N.A.P.
 North American Pairs, an annual contract bridge competition
 North AmeriCare Park, a former name of Sahlen Field, is a baseball park in Buffalo, New York
 Noyautage des administrations publiques, an arm of the French Resistance

See also
 Gnap (disambiguation)
 Knap
 Nape (disambiguation)
 Napp (disambiguation)
 Nappe (disambiguation)
 Naps (disambiguation)

Lists of people by nickname